Confessional is a 2007 mockumentary indie film by Jerrold Tarog and Ruel Dahis Antipuesto.  It won Best Film in the First Features Section of 10th Osian Festival of Asian and Arab Cinema in New Delhi.

Plot
On a trip to Cebu to document the Sinulog Festival, Ryan Pastor meets Lito Caliso, an erring politician, who confesses to Ryan's camera all the crimes he committed while in office.

Cast
David Barril as Ryan Pastor
Publio Briones III as  Lito Caliso
Greg Fernandez as Miguel
Donna Gimeno as Miguel's Wife
Owee Salva as Monet Silva
Paola Aseron as Kathy Escueta
Jude Bacalso as Jhae Zaspa
Bambi Beltran as Sister Ana Maria Teresa
Archie Modequillo as Marcus
Jay Roderick Rabin as Undo
Ruel Rigor	as Prof. Romulo Albaracin

Awards
10th Osian Festival of Asian and Arab Cinema
Best Film - Confessional
Cinema One Originals
Best Picture - Confessional
Best Director - Jerrold Tarog and Ruel Dahis Antipuesto
Best Screenplay - Ramon Ukit (aka Jerrold Tarog)
Best Editing - Pats R. Ranyo (aka Jerrold Tarog)
Best Supporting Actor - Publio Briones III
Best Sound - Roger "TJ" Ladro (aka Jerrold Tarog)
Star Cinema Special Award
24th PMPC STAR AWARDS
Best Film (Digital Category) - Confessional
Best Director - Jerrold Tarog and Ruel Dahis Antipuesto
Best Screenplay - Ramon Ukit (aka Jerrold Tarog)
Best Editing - Pats R. Ranyo (aka Jerrold Tarog)
Best Sound - Roger "TJ" Ladro (aka Jerrold Tarog)
56th FAMAS Awards (2008)
Best Theme Song (Winner) - "Sine-Sine" by Missing Filemon

Notes

See also
 Cinema of the Philippines

References

External links
 
 
Confessional on Click the City

2007 films
2000s mockumentary films
2000s political films
Films directed by Jerrold Tarog
Philippine New Wave